"Run" is a song written by Anthony Smith and Tony Lane, and recorded by American country music artist George Strait.  It was released in September 2001 as the lead single from Strait's album The Road Less Traveled.

Content
The narrator tells his lover to leave Dallas, Texas and "run" to him. During the song the narrator lists many different forms of transport that his lover can take to reach him.

Critical reception
Chuck Taylor in his review of the single for Billboard Magazine called the song's production "intriguing" and that Strait's "warm vocals weave through a haunting melody." He said that there is a progressive feel to the track but the mandolin and steel guitar keep it traditional.

Commercial performance
"Run" debuted at number 36 on the U.S. Billboard Hot Country Singles & Tracks for the chart week of October 13, 2001. The song reached number 2 on the Billboard Hot Country Songs charts in December 2001, where it was blocked by Toby Keith's "I Wanna Talk About Me". It then reached number 2 again in early January 2002, where it was blocked by Alan Jackson's "Where Were You (When the World Stopped Turning)", and again in early February of the same year, being blocked by Steve Holy's "Good Morning Beautiful".  It also peaked at number 34 on the Billboard Hot 100, making it a minor crossover hit. The song has sold 390,000 copies in the United States as of April 2019.

The song's b-side, "The Real Thing", was later the b-side to the album's next single, "Living and Living Well". Although not released as a single itself, "The Real Thing" charted at number 60 for the country chart dated March 22, 2003.

Charts

Year-end charts

Certifications

References

2001 singles
2001 songs
George Strait songs
Songs written by Tony Lane (songwriter)
Songs written by Anthony Smith (singer)
Song recordings produced by Tony Brown (record producer)
MCA Nashville Records singles